Vernon Dixon (died 14 June 2009) was a British set decorator. He won three Academy Awards in the category Best Art Direction.

Selected filmography
Dixon won three Academy Awards for Best Art Direction:
 Oliver! (1968)
 Nicholas and Alexandra (1971)
 Barry Lyndon (1975)

References

External links

2009 deaths
British set decorators
Best Art Direction Academy Award winners
Year of birth missing